The 13th Ohio Cavalry Regiment was a cavalry regiment that served in the Union Army during the American Civil War.

Service
The 13th Ohio Cavalry Regiment was organized by consolidation of the 4th Ohio Independent Battalion Cavalry and 5th Ohio Independent Battalion Cavalry at Camp Chase in Columbus, Ohio, on May 5, 1864, under the command of Colonel Stephen R. Clark.  The regiment was used as infantry until December 12, 1864.

The regiment was attached to 1st Brigade, 3rd Division, IX Corps, Army of the Potomac, June 8 to August 10, 1864. 1st Brigade, 1st Division, IX Corps, to December 10. 3rd Brigade, 2nd Division, Cavalry Corps, Army of the Potomac, to May 1865. Sub-District of the Appomattox, District of the Nottaway, Department of Virginia, to August 1865.

The 13th Ohio Cavalry mustered out of service August 10, 1865, at Petersburg, Virginia.

Detailed service
The regiment left Ohio for Annapolis, Md., May 11, then moved to White House Landing, Va., May 18. At Washington, D.C., May 14–18, 1864. Marched to White House Landing May 18, and served duty there until June. Moved to Cold Harbor, Va. Participated in operations about Cold Harbor June 6–12. Before Petersburg June 16–19. Siege operations against Petersburg and Richmond, Va., June 16, 1864, to April 2, 1865. Mine Explosion July 30, 1864, Weldon Railroad August 18–21. Poplar Springs Church September 29-October 2. Vaughan and Squirrel Level Road October 8. Boydton Plank Road, Hatcher's Run, October 27–28. Equipped for cavalry services December 12. Dabney's Mills, Hatcher's Run, February 5–7, 1865. Appomattox Campaign March 28-April 9. Dinwiddie Court House March 30–31. Five Forks April 1. Fall of Petersburg April 2. Amelia Springs April 5. Sayler's Creek and Harper's Farm April 6. Farmville April 7. Appomattox Court House April 9. Surrender of Lee and his army. Expedition to Danville to cooperate with Gen. Sherman April 23–29. Assigned to provost duty in Amelia and Powhatan Counties until August 10.

Casualties
The regiment lost a total of 117 men during service; 4 officers and 61 enlisted men killed or mortally wounded, 1 officer and 51 enlisted men died of disease.

Commanders
 Colonel Stephen R. Clark

Notable members
 Private Nathaniel Gwynne, Company H - Medal of Honor recipient for action at the Battle of the Crater
 Sergeant James Kastor Peirsol, Company F - Medal of Honor recipient for action at Paines Crossroads, May 3, 1865

See also

 List of Ohio Civil War units
 Ohio in the Civil War

References
 Aston, Howard. History and Roster of the Fourth and Fifth Independent Battalions and Thirteenth Regiment Ohio Cavalry Volunteers:  Their Battles and Skirmishes, Roster of the Dead, etc. (Columbus, OH:  Press of F. J. Heer), 1902. 
 Dyer, Frederick H.  A Compendium of the War of the Rebellion (Des Moines, IA:  Dyer Pub. Co.), 1908.
 Harvey, Marshall S. Recollections of 1864-5 After Forty Years (Columbus, OH:  s.n.), 1904.  [author was a private in Company I]
 Ohio Roster Commission. Official Roster of the Soldiers of the State of Ohio in the War on the Rebellion, 1861–1865, Compiled Under the Direction of the Roster Commission (Akron, OH: Werner Co.), 1886–1895.
 Reid, Whitelaw. Ohio in the War: Her Statesmen, Her Generals, and Soldiers (Cincinnati, OH: Moore, Wilstach, & Baldwin), 1868. 
Attribution

External links
 Ohio in the Civil War: 13th Ohio Cavalry by Larry Stevens
 Regimental flag of the 13th Ohio Cavalry
 Guidon of the 13th Ohio Cavalry
 Another guidon of the 13th Ohio Cavalry

Military units and formations established in 1864
Military units and formations disestablished in 1865
Units and formations of the Union Army from Ohio
1864 establishments in Ohio